Francesco Boccaccino (c. 1680–1750) was an Italian painter of the Baroque. He was born at Cremona. He studied at Rome, first under Giacinto Brandi, and afterwards worked in the studio of Carlo Maratta. The Cremonese Antonio Beltrami was one of Boccaccino's pupils.

Gallery

References

1680 births
1750 deaths
17th-century Italian painters
Italian male painters
18th-century Italian painters
Painters from Cremona
Italian Baroque painters
Pupils of Carlo Maratta
18th-century Italian male artists